Anouk Kruithof (born 1981) is a Dutch artist whose exhibitions and books merge social, conceptual, photographic, performance and video. Kruithof has had published, or self-published, a number of books of her work (including Happy Birthday to You), and had her work exhibited in solo and group shows including at Museum of Modern Art in New York. She has received an Infinity Award from the International Center of Photography; both the Photography Jury Grand Prize and the Photo Global scholarship from Hyères International Fashion and Photography Festival, and the Charlotte Köhler Prize from Prins Bernhard Cultuurfonds. She is based in New York.

Life and work
Kruithof was born in 1981 in Dordrecht, the Netherlands. She studied photography at the Academy of Art and Design St. Joost, based in Breda. She completed an artist's residency at the Künstlerhaus Bethanien in Berlin in 2008–2009. In 2011 she moved to New York to live and work on her art projects.

Publications

Publications by Kruithof
Het Zwarte gat = The Black Hole. With Jaap Scheeren. Rotterdam, the Netherlands: Episode, 2006. .
Playing Borders, This Contemporary State of Mind. Berlin: Revolver by Vice Versa, 2009. . Edition of 400 copies.
Becoming Blue. Berlin: Revolver by Vice Versa, 2009. . Texts in English, German and Dutch.
The Daily Exhaustion. Baden, Switzerland: Kodoji, 2010. . Edition of 5000 copies. Free newspaper.
A Head with Wings. St Paul, MN: Little Brown Mushroom, 2011. . Edition of 1000 copies. Commissioned by Alec Soth; design by Kruithof, Soth and Hans Seeger.
Lang Zal ze Leven = Happy Birthday to You. Self-published, 2011. . Edition of 500 copies.
Pixel-stress. Paris: RVB Books, 2013. . Edition of 1000 copies.
SPBH pamphlet IV: Case report 468. London: Self Publish, Be Happy, 2013. . Edition of 500 copies. Pamphlet, folds out into poster. Text by Hillery Bosworth, photographs by Kruithof and series editor Nicholas Muellner. According to the colophon, "The pamphlet was created in conversation with the collection of Jan Larsen and Tang Nguyen, on April 26 and 27, 2013 in New York city" and "This special edition pamphlet was commissioned by and distributed in conjunction with 10x10 American photobooks in association with the International Center of Photography library, Photobook Facebook Group and Tokyo Institute of Photography."
Untitled (I’ve taken too many photos / I’ve never taken a photo). Rotterdam: Stress, 2014. . Edition of 500 copies.
The Bungalow. Eindhoven, the Netherlands: Onomatopee, 2014. . Uses photographs by Brad Feuerhelm. Edited in collaboration with Freek Lomme (text) and Christof Nussli (images). Edition of 1200 copies.
Neutral. Munich, Germany: Galerie Jo van de Loo; self-published, 2016. Text by Christoph Sehl. Edition of 200 copies.
Automagic. Madrid and Mexico City: Editorial RM; self-published: Stresspress.biz, 2016. With text by Kruithof and Iñaki Domingo. Edition of 1000 copies.

Publications with contributions by Kruithof
Borough(ed) stories: Drawings and portraits from neighborhoods in New York, Berlin and Amsterdam = tekeningen en portretten uit wijken in New York, Berlijn en Amsterdam. Silvia Russel, 2009. . Drawings by Silvia Russel, photographs by Kruithof and others, essay by Mitchell Marco, preface by Louky Keijsers, translation by Nienke de Maat.
The Riso Book: New York. San Francisco, CA: Colpa; New York, NY: Endless Editions, 2014. Kruithof with Paul Branca, David Horvitz, Matthew Palladino and Dexter Sinister. Each artist contributed to 20 pages. Fifth in The Riso Book series. Edition of 100 copies.
Photographers' Sketchbooks. London: Thames & Hudson, 2014. . Edited by Stephen McLaren and Bryan Formhals.
Printed Web #4: Public, Private, Secret. Paul Soulellis; Library of the Printed Web and International Center of Photography Museum, 2016. . 40 pages. Published on the occasion of an exhibition, Public, Private, Secret, at the International Center of Photography Museum, 2016/17. Print-on-demand newsprint. Work by Kruithof, Wolfgang Plöger, Lorna Mills, Molly Soda, Travess Smalley, Angela Genusa, Eva and Franco Mattes, Elisabeth Tonnard, and Christopher Clary. With a text by Michael Connor ("Folding the Web").

Awards
2011: Photography Jury Grand Prize, Hyères International Fashion and Photography Festival, Hyères, France. For Happy Birthday to You and The Daily Exhaustion.
2011: scholarship to the Photo Global programme of the School of Visual Arts in New York, Hyères International Fashion and Photography Festival, Hyères, France.
2012: Infinity Award, Young Photographer category, International Center of Photography, New York, NY.
2014: Charlotte Köhler Prize, Prins Bernhard Cultuurfonds. €30000 prize.

Exhibitions

Solo exhibitions
2009: Becoming Blue and Enclosed Content Chatting Away In The Colour Invisibility, Künstlerhaus Bethanien, Berlin, 2009.
2009/2010: Becoming Blue and Enclosed Content Chatting Away In The Colour Invisibility, Museum Het Domein Sittard, Sittard, Netherlands, 2010.
2010: Becoming Blue and Enclosed Content Chatting Away In The Colour Invisibility, Galerie Adler, Frankfurt, 2010.
2012: Fragmented Entity, 2012, Boetzelaer Nispen, London.
2013: Every Thing is Wave, 2013, Boetzelaer Nispen, London.
2015: #Evidence, Boetzelaer Nispen, Amsterdam, 2015.
2016: Neutral, Galerie Jo van de Loo, Munich, Germany, 2016.

Exhibitions with others and at festivals
2012: Untitled (I’ve taken too many photos / I’ve never taken a photo), Tour des Templiers, Hyères International Fashion and Photography Festival, Hyères, France.
2012: The Youth Code, part of Daegu Photo Biennale, Daegu, South Korea. Included work by Kruitof as well as Ryan McGinley, Willem Popelier and Viviane Sassen.
2015: Ocean of Images: New Photography 2015, Museum of Modern Art, New York, 2015/16. Photographs by Kruithof as well as Ilit Azoulay, Zbyněk Baladrán, Lucas Blalock, Edson Chagas, Natalie Czech, DIS (collective), Katharina Gaenssler, David Hartt, Mishka Henner, David Horvitz, John Houck, Yuki Kimura, Basim Magdy, Katja Novitskova, Marina Pinsky, Lele Saveri, Indrė Šerpytytė, and Lieko Shiga.

References

External links
 
'Little Brown Mushroom Blog: Breaking the Wall: An interview with Anouk Kruithof' - a transcript of an Alec Soth interview with Kruithof about the making of A Head with Wings.
Video interview with Kruithof about Subconscious Traveling, The Museum of Modern Art

Living people
1981 births
Dutch women photographers
Dutch conceptual artists
Artists from Dordrecht